Marcin is a male given name or surname. It is the Polish equivalent of the English name Martin; the female version is Martyna.

Notable people with the name Marcin include:

Given name
 Marcin Adamski (born 1975), Polish footballer
 Marcin Awiżeń (born 1985), Polish Paralympian middle distance runner
 Marcin Dorociński (born 1973), Polish actor
 Marcin Gortat (born 1984), Polish basketball player
 Marcin Held (born 1992), Polish mixed martial artist
 Marcin Jakubowski founded Open Source Ecology (OSE) in 2003
 Marcin Kaczmarek (disambiguation), several people
 Marcin Kaczmarek (footballer) (born 1979), Polish footballer
 Marcin Kaczmarek (swimmer) (born 1977), Polish butterfly swimmer
 Marcin Kalinowski (1605–1652), Polish nobleman
 Marcin Kleczynski (born 1989), co-founder and CEO of Malwarebytes Inc.
 Marcin Kromer (1512–1583), Polish historian and chronicler, royal secretary, bishop of Warmia
 Marcin Lewandowski (born 1987), Polish 800m runner
 Marcin Matkowski (born 1981), Polish tennis player
 Marcin Mroziński (born 1981), Polish-English actor, singer and television presenter
 Marcin Nowak (disambiguation), several people
 Marcin Patrzalek (born 2000), Polish guitarist
 Marcin Odlanicki Poczobutt (1728–1810), Polish-Lithuanian Jesuit astronomer and mathematician
 Marcin Rożek (1885–1944), Polish sculptor and painter
 Marcin Święcicki (born 1947), Polish politician and economist
 Marcin Świetlicki (born 1961), Polish poet, writer, musician
 Stanislaw Marcin Ulam (1909–1984), Polish mathematician who participated in the Manhattan Project
 Marcin of Urzędów (1500–1573), Polish priest, physician, botanist
 Marcin Wolski (born 1947), Polish writer and satirist
 Marcin of Wrocimowice (died 1442), Polish knight and diplomat

Surname
 Max Marcin (1879–1949), Polish screenwriter and film director

See also
 

Polish masculine given names